Exit... nur keine Panik (German for Exit – But Don't Panic) is a 1980 Austrian tragi-comic gangster film, directed by Franz Novotny. It has become a cult film.

Plot

Kirchhoff is a street crook living in Vienna. He dreams of having his own coffee house and being loved by many beautiful women.

Production and legacy

The music was composed by Otto M. Zykan.

Fifteen years later, a sequel to the film was released: Exit II - Verklärte Nacht. In 2007, Exit... nur keine Panik was made available on DVD.

Cast
 Hanno Pöschl as Kirchhoff
 Paulus Manker as Plachinger
 Isolde Barth as Gerti
 Eddie Constantine as Poigrard
 Peter Weibel as Langner
 Kurt Kren as Voyeur
 Hans Georg Nenning as Man on U-Bahn
 Franz Suhrada as Waiter
 Sabrina Thurm as Girl
 Ulli Neumann
 Konrad Becker
 Peter Turrini
 Ernst Schmidt, Jr.
 Peter Patzak
 Curt A. Tichy

Sources

External links
 *
 https://web.archive.org/web/20151222142014/http://worldscinema.org/2012/09/franz-novotny-exit-nur-keine-panik-aka-exit-but-no-panic-1980/

1980 films
1980s crime comedy films
Austrian crime comedy films
1980s German-language films
Films directed by Franz Novotny
Films set in Vienna
Films shot in Vienna
1980 comedy films